SM Rezaul Karim is a Bangladesh Awami League politician and the incumbent Jatiya Sangsad member representing the Pirojpur-1 constituency. He is the current minister of fisheries and livestock since 13 February 2020. Earlier he served as the minister of housing and public works for  11  months.

Career
Karim was elected to parliament from Pirojpur-1 as a Bangladesh Awami League candidate 30 December 2018.

WIKIPEDIA UPDATE

Career:

    I.         Minister of the Ministry of the Fisheries & Livestock (Since 2020 to till now).

   II.         Member, Parliamentary Standing Committee of the Ministry of Fishery & Livestock (since 2020 to till now).

  III.         Former Minister, Ministry of Housing & Public Works (2019 to 2020)

  IV.         Member, Parliamentary Standing Committee of Ministry of Housing & Public Works (2019 to 2020).

   V.         Elected as a Member of Parliament from Pirojpur-1 as a Bangladesh Awami League candidate on 30 December 2018.

Legal Career:

    I.         Enrolled as an Advocate with Bangladesh Bar Council on 9 March 1987.

   II.         Enrolled as an Advocate of the High Court Division of Supreme Court of Bangladesh on 28 January 1995.

  III.         Enrolled as an Advocate of the Appellate Division of the Supreme Court of Bangladesh on 12 May 2008.

  IV.         Elected as Secretary of the Bangladesh Supreme Court Bar Association- For the year 2009 to 2010.

   V.         Enrolled as a Senior Advocate of the Supreme Court of Bangladesh on 1 March 2018.

  VI.         Elected as Member of Bangladesh Bar Council for two terms (2015 to 2018) & (2018 to 2021).

 VII.         Chairman of the Finance Committee of Bangladesh Bar Council for two consecutive terms (2015-2021).

Political Identify:

     I.         Legal Affairs Secretary of Central Executive Committee of Bangladesh Awami League.

    II.         Former Vice-President (V.P) of Doulatpur College Student Union, Khulna.

   III.         Former General Secretary (G.S) of the Student union, Government Agriculture College, Khulna.

   IV.         Former Vice-President, Khulna City Unit of Bangladesh Chattro League (Student front of Bangladesh Awami League).

    V.         Former General Secretary, Nazirpur Upazilla Awami League.

   VI.         Member, Executive Committee of Pirojpur District Awami League (Since 1990).

  VII.         Member, Bangabandhu Awami Ainjibi Porishad Central Committee.

VIII.         General Secretary, Pirojpur District Awami Parishad, Dhaka.

Contribution as an Advocate: 

     I.         Lawyer of Honourable Prime Minister SHEIKH HASINA (During 1/11 Government of 2007).

    II.         Lawyer of hon’ble Minister Mr. Obaidul Quader; Mr. Abul Hasnat Abdullah, former Chief Whip of Parliament and many other leaders of

Awami League (During 1/11 Government of 2007).

   III.         Performed as one of the lawyer of Bangabandhu Sheikh Mujibur Rahman Murder Case on behalf of the State.

   IV.         Performed as one of the lawyer of Jail Killing Case on behalf of the State.

    V.         In many other important cases.

References

Living people
Awami League politicians
11th Jatiya Sangsad members
Housing and Public Works ministers of Bangladesh
Fisheries and Livestock ministers of Bangladesh
Place of birth missing (living people)
1962 births